Stigmella vimineticola is a moth of the family Nepticulidae. It is found from Norway to Spain and Italy, and from France to Slovakia.

The larvae feed on the leaves of Salix eleagnos and Salix incana. They mine the leaves of their host plant. The mine they produce resembles the mine of Stigmella obliquella.

References

External links
Fauna Europaea
 bladmineerders.nl

Nepticulidae
Moths of Europe
Taxa named by Heinrich Frey
Moths described in 1856